Guar Chempedak is a small town in Yan District, Kedah, Malaysia. Guar Chempedak is situated within the parliamentary constituency of Jerai. Guar Chempedak comes from two words, in which Guar means 'hilly land' and Chempedak or cempedak is a name of a fruit that is believed to be widely available here in any season.

It was where the tragic 1989 Taufiqiah Al-Khairiah madrasa fire occurred.

Towns in Kedah
Yan District